First Watch is an American restaurant chain based in Bradenton, Florida. As of June 2021, the chain has more than 420 locations in 28 states and 9,000 employees. First Watch is also the owner of Sun & Fork by First Watch, a fast-casual café concept located in Nashville, Tennessee.

First Watch offers menu items such as avocado toast, smoked salmon eggs benedict, farm stand breakfast tacos, lemon ricotta pancakes, and a fresh juice bar.

History
The name First Watch is a nautical reference to the first work shift aboard a ship as First Watch restaurants are only open from 7:00 AM to 2:30 PM.  The first location was opened in Pacific Grove, California in 1983 by Ken Pendery and John Sullivan. The co-owners founded it after leaving the Le Peep breakfast chain in Colorado. In 1986, they moved their headquarters to Bradenton, Florida.

2014-present
In 2014, First Watch bought The Good Egg, which is located in Arizona. As of 2021, 18 of The Good Egg restaurants have been converted into First Watch restaurants. In May 2015, the company acquired the Colorado-based Egg & I Restaurants chain. The Egg & I has 114 eateries across twenty states. Not every Egg & I Restaurant location will become a First Watch, but as of 2016, 22 conversions had been completed. In 2012 First Watch ranked as the best breakfast chain in a survey of 150,000 Consumer Reports readers earning top ratings in taste, service, value, and menu choices.

In 2017 private equity firm Advent International bought a majority stake in First Watch. Advent International bought First Watch from Freeman Spogli & Co, which obtained First Watch in 2011. Freeman Spogli & Co. bought out the 85 percent stake previously held by Catterton Partners. Catterton's stake was acquired in 2004 with a $35 million investment that allowed First Watch to expand in the Southeast and Midwest, doubling the number of First Watch restaurants. First Watch has a large presence in Florida, Texas, Pennsylvania, Ohio, Colorado, and Arizona. First Watch and the Egg & I restaurants serve breakfast, brunch, and lunch and offer a wide variety of items.

In 2018, First Watch began to source its coffee from Huila, Colombia to “support hard-working women and their families in Huila in 2018.” Royal Cup Coffee, an Alabama-based coffee company, roasts the coffee. In October 2021, First Watch went public with an initial public offering raising $170 million on Nasdaq.

References

External links
 

Restaurants in Florida
Restaurants established in 1983
Companies listed on the Nasdaq
1983 establishments in California
2021 initial public offerings
Companies based in Manatee County, Florida